Dead Mountain Mouth is the debut full-length album by Genghis Tron. It was released on June 6, 2006, on Crucial Blast in CD format, and on June 27, 2006, on Lovepump United in vinyl format (white and clear coloured). A vinyl reissue of the album was released in late 2008, again on Lovepump United.

Background
The album is more varied than the previous EP, and features the band exploring such genres as doom metal, intelligent dance music (IDM), power noise, experimental rock and grindcore. Both the album and the title track quote and echo T. S. Eliot's poem, The Waste Land, involving pivotal themes of disconnectedness, disharmony and non-fecundity.

Track listing

Personnel
Genghis Tron
Hamilton Jordan – guitar, bass guitar
Michael Sochynsky – programming, keyboards
Mookie Singerman – vocals

Additional musicians
Mike McKenzie (The Red Chord) – additional vocals on "Dead Mountain Mouth" and "White Walls" 
Jake Friedman – additional vocals on "The Folding Road" and "Asleep on the Forest Floor" 
Greg Weeks – additional bass guitar on "Asleep on the Forest Floor"

Production
Alan Douches – mastering
Kurt Ballou – recording, mixing
Kim Dumas – sequencing
Jon Beasley – artwork, design

References

2006 albums
Genghis Tron albums
Albums produced by Kurt Ballou